The 2018 Indiana Hoosiers baseball team is a college baseball team that represented Indiana University in the 2018 NCAA Division I baseball season. The Hoosiers are members of the Big Ten Conference (B1G) and played their home games at Bart Kaufman Field in Bloomington, Indiana. They were led by fourth-year head coach Chris Lemonis.

Following the conclusion of the regular season, the Hoosiers were selected to play in the 2018 NCAA Tournament, beginning in the Austin Regional. The Hoosiers would eventually lose in the final round of the Austin Regional to Texas by a score of 2–3.

Previous season
The Hoosiers finished the 2017 NCAA Division I baseball season 34–24–2 overall (14–9–1 conference) and sixth place in conference standings. The Hoosiers were selected to play in the 2017 NCAA Tournament, beginning in the Lexington Regional. The Hoosiers would eventually lose in the second round of the Lexington Regional to Kentucky by a score of 9–14.

MLB draft
The following Hoosiers on the 2017 roster were selected in the 2017 Major League Baseball draft:

* indicates draftee had no more college eligibility

Preseason
On July 13, 2017, head coach Lemonis added former East Tennessee State Buccaneers assistant coach Zach Lucas to the same position for the Hoosiers. On December 12, 2017, Lemonis named junior catcher Ryan Fineman and junior right-handed pitcher Pauly Milto to Captain status for the 2018 year.

On December 19, 2017, Indiana University Athletics announced plans to install an LED video scoreboard, beyond the outfield wall. The size of the new scoreboard is estimated to be 26.8 feet (8.16 m) high by 48.7 (14.84 m) feet wide. Installation of the new scoreboard was completed prior to the start of the season.

Season projections
Coming off of an NCAA Regional appearance in 2017, the 2018 Hoosiers were projected to finish first in conference play by B1G coaches and projected to receive the conference's automatic bid to the 2018 NCAA Division I baseball tournament. The Hoosiers were ranked in four of the six major preseason polls and rankings, while receiving votes for ranking in the two others. The Hoosiers were ranked #17 by Perfect Game, #24 in the NCBWA Poll, #23 by D1 Baseball and #20 by Baseball America.

Roster

Schedule

! style="" | Regular season
|- valign="top" 

|- bgcolor="#ffcccc"
| 1 || February 16 || vs  || || Myrtle Beach, South Carolina(Brittain Resorts Baseball at the Beach) || 3–6 || 0–1 || –
|- bgcolor="#ccffcc"
| 2 || February 17 || vs  || || Myrtle Beach, South Carolina(Brittain Resorts Baseball at the Beach) || 5–0 || 1–1 || –
|- bgcolor="#ccffcc"
| 3 || February 18 || vs  || || Myrtle Beach, South Carolina(Brittain Resorts Baseball at the Beach) || 8–4 || 2–1 || –
|- bgcolor="#ccffcc"
| 4 || February 19 || vs Coastal Carolina || || Conway, South Carolina(Brittain Resorts Baseball at the Beach) || 6–5 || 3–1 || –
|- bgcolor="#ccffcc"
| 5 || February 23 || vs  || || Port Charlotte, Florida, (Snowbird Baseball Classic) || 8–4 || 4–1 || –
|- bgcolor="#ccffcc"
| 6 || February 24 || vs  || || Port Charlotte, Florida (Snowbird Baseball Classic) || 4–0 || 5–1 || –
|- bgcolor="#ccffcc"
| 7 || February 25 || vs  || || Port Charlotte, Florida (Snowbird Baseball Classic) || 7–2 || 6–1 || –
|-

|- bgcolor="#ccffcc"
| 8 || March 2 || at  || #22 || Fowler Park • San Diego, California || 10–4 || 7–1 || –
|- bgcolor="#ffcccc"
| 9 ||  || at San Diego || #22 || Fowler Park • San Diego, California || 5–6|| 7–2 || –
|- bgcolor="#ccffcc"
| 10 ||  || at San Diego || #22 || Fowler Park • San Diego, California || 6–5 || 8–2 || –
|- bgcolor="#ccffcc"
| 11 || March 4 || at San Diego || #22 || Fowler Park • San Diego, California || 8–4 || 9–2 || –
|- bgcolor="#ffcccc"
| 12 || March 6 ||  || #12 || Bart Kaufman Field • Bloomington, Indiana || 3–8 || 9–3 || –
|- bgcolor="#ffcccc"
| 13 || March 9 ||  || #12 || Bart Kaufman Field • Bloomington, Indiana || 1–2 || 9–4 || –
|- bgcolor="#ccffcc"
| 14 || March 10 || Pacific || #12 || Bart Kaufman Field • Bloomington, Indiana || 3–1 || 10–4 || –
|- bgcolor="#ccffcc"
| 15 || March 11 || Pacific || #12 || Bart Kaufman Field • Bloomington, Indiana || 4–2 || 11–4 || –
|- bgcolor="#bbbbbb"
| 16 || March 13 ||  || #15 || Bart Kaufman Field • Bloomington, Indiana || Cancelled || 11–4 || –
|- bgcolor="#ccffcc"
| 17 || March 14 || Western Illinois || #15 || Bart Kaufman Field • Bloomington, Indiana || 11–1 || 12–4 || –
|- bgcolor="#ccffcc"
| 18 || March 16 ||  || #15 || Bart Kaufman Field • Bloomington, Indiana || 18–0 || 13–4 || –
|- bgcolor="#ccffcc"
| 19 || March 17 || Northern Illinois || #15 || Bart Kaufman Field • Bloomington, Indiana || 4–3 || 14–4 || –
|- bgcolor="#ccffcc"
| 20 || March 18 || Northern Illinois || #15 || Bart Kaufman Field • Bloomington, Indiana || 4–3 || 15–4 || –
|- bgcolor="#bbbbbb"
| 21 || March 21 ||  || #14 || Bart Kaufman Field • Bloomington, Indiana ||Cancelled || 15–4 || –
|- bgcolor="#ccffcc"
| 22 ||  || at  || #14 || Duane Banks Field • Iowa City, Iowa ||4–2 || 16–4 || 1–0
|- bgcolor="#ffcccc"
| 23 ||  || at Iowa || #14 || Duane Banks Field • Iowa City, Iowa ||1–5 || 16–5 || 1–1
|- bgcolor="#bbbbbb"
| 24 || March 25 || at Iowa || #14 || Duane Banks Field • Iowa City, Iowa ||Cancelled || 16–5 || 1–1
|- bgcolor="#ccffcc"
| 25 || March 28 || at  || #17 || Bob Warn Field at Sycamore Stadium • Terre Haute, Indiana ||5–3 || 17–5 || 1–1
|- bgcolor="#ccffcc"
| 25 ||  ||  || #17 || Bart Kaufman Field • Bloomington, Indiana ||6–5|| 18–5 || 1–1
|- bgcolor="#ccffcc"
| 25 ||  || Butler || #17 || Bart Kaufman Field • Bloomington, Indiana || 13–0 || 19–5 || 1–1
|- bgcolor="#ccffcc"
| 25 || March 31 || Butler || #17 || Bart Kaufman Field • Bloomington, Indiana || 10–3 || 20–5 || 1–1
|-

|- bgcolor="#bbbbbb"
| 26 || April 3 || at  || #13 || Ball Diamond • Muncie, Indiana ||Cancelled || 20–5 || 1–1
|- bgcolor="#ffcccc"
| 27 || April 6 || Purdue || #13 || Bart Kaufman Field • Bloomington, Indiana || 2–4 || 20–6 || 1–2
|- bgcolor="#ccffcc"
| 28 || April 7 || Purdue || #13 || Bart Kaufman Field • Bloomington, Indiana ||14–1 || 21–6 || 2–2
|- bgcolor="#ccffcc"
| 29 || April 8 || Purdue || #13 || Bart Kaufman Field • Bloomington, Indiana || 7–5 || 22–6 || 3–2
|- bgcolor="#ccffcc"
| 30 || April 10 || Indiana State || #15 || Bart Kaufman Field • Bloomington, Indiana ||6–1 || 23–6 || 3–2
|- bgcolor="#ccffcc"
| 31 ||  ||  || #15 || Bart Kaufman Field • Bloomington, Indiana || 12–0 || 24–6 || 4–2
|- bgcolor="#ccffcc"
| 32 ||  || Northwestern || #15 || Bart Kaufman Field • Bloomington, Indiana || 6–3 || 25–6 || 5–2
|- bgcolor="#ccffcc"
| 33 || April 15 || Northwestern || #15 || Bart Kaufman Field • Bloomington, Indiana || 22–1 || 26–6 || 6–2
|- bgcolor="#ccffcc"
| 34 || April 17 || vs  || #16 || Victory Field • Indianapolis, Indiana || 3–0 || 27–6 || 6–2
|- bgcolor="#ccffcc"
| 35 || April 18 || Ball State || #16 || Bart Kaufman Field • Bloomington, Indiana || 9–8 || 28–6 || 6–2
|- bgcolor="#ccffcc"
| 36 || April 20 || at  || #16 || Bill Davis Stadium • Columbus, Ohio, ||4–0 || 29–6 || 7–2
|- bgcolor="#ffcccc"
| 37 || April 21 || at Ohio State || #16 || Bill Davis Stadium • Columbus, Ohio ||4–5 || 29–7 || 7–3
|- bgcolor="#ffcccc"
| 38 || April 22 || at Ohio State || #16 || Bill Davis Stadium • Columbus, Ohio || 5–6 || 29–8 || 7–4
|- bgcolor="#ffcccc"
| 39 || April 25 || at Purdue || #27 || Alexander Field • West Lafayette, Indiana || 3–5 || 29–9 || 7–4
|- bgcolor="#ffcccc"
| 40 || April 27 || Illinois || #27 || Bart Kaufman Field • Bloomington, Indiana || 2–3 || 29–10 || 7–5
|- bgcolor="#ccffcc"
| 41 || April 28 || Illinois || #27 || Bart Kaufman Field • Bloomington, Indiana || 2–1 || 30–10 || 8–5
|- bgcolor="#ccffcc"
| 42 || April 29 || Illinois || #27 || Bart Kaufman Field • Bloomington, Indiana || 9–2 || 31–10 || 9–5
|-

|- bgcolor="#ffcccc"
| 44 || May 4 || at  || || Siebert Field • Minneapolis, Minnesota, || 1–4 || 31–11 || 9–6
|- bgcolor="#ffcccc"
| 45 || May 5 || at Minnesota || || Siebert Field • Minneapolis, Minnesota || 1–9 || 31–12 || 9–7
|- bgcolor="#ffcccc"
| 46 || May 6 || at Minnesota || || Siebert Field • Minneapolis, Minnesota || 6–7 || 31–13 || 9–8
|- bgcolor="#ffcccc"
| 47 || May 8 || Kentucky || || Bart Kaufman Field • Bloomington, Indiana || 6–7 || 31–14 || 9–8
|- bgcolor="#ffcccc"
| 48 || May 11 || at  || || Haymarket Park • Lincoln, Nebraska, || 2–5 || 31–15 || 9–9
|- bgcolor="#ccffcc"
| 49 || May 12 || at Nebraska || || Haymarket Park • Lincoln, Nebraska|| 6–3 || 32–15 || 10–9
|- bgcolor="#ccffcc"
| 50 || May 13 || at Nebraska || || Haymarket Park • Lincoln, Nebraska|| 8–6|| 33–15 || 11–9
|- bgcolor="#ccffcc"
| 51 || May 15 ||  || || Jim Patterson Stadium • Louisville, Kentucky, || 9–5|| 34–15 || 11–9
|- bgcolor="#ccffcc"
| 52 || May 17 ||  || || Bart Kaufman Field • Bloomington, Indiana || 6–5 || 35–15 || 12–9
|- bgcolor="#ccffcc"
| 53 || May 18 || Maryland || || Bart Kaufman Field • Bloomington, Indiana || 5–1 || 36–15 || 13–9
|- bgcolor="#ccffcc"
| 54 || May 19 || Maryland || || Bart Kaufman Field • Bloomington, Indiana || 5–1 || 37–15 || 14–9
|-

|-
! style="" | Post-Season
|- 

|- bgcolor="#ffcccc"
| 55 || May 23 || Illinois || TD Ameritrade Park • Omaha, Nebraska, || 1–7|| 37–16 || 14–9
|- bgcolor="#ccffcc"
| 56 || May 24 ||  || TD Ameritrade Park • Omaha, Nebraska || 6–5 || 38–16 || 14–9
|- bgcolor="#ffcccc"
| 57 || May 25 || Illinois || TD Ameritrade Park • Omaha, Nebraska || 4–5 || 38–17 || 14–9
|-

|- bgcolor="#ffcccc"
| 58 || June 1 ||  || UFCU Disch–Falk Field • Austin, Texas, || 3–10 || 38–18 || 14–9
|- bgcolor="#ccffcc"
| 59 || June 2 ||  || UFCU Disch–Falk Field • Austin, Texas || 6–0 || 39–18 || 14–9
|- bgcolor="#ccffcc"
| 60 || June 3 || Texas A&M || UFCU Disch–Falk Field • Austin, Texas || 9–7 || 40–18 || 14–9
|- bgcolor="#ffcccc"
| 61 || June 3 || Texas || UFCU Disch–Falk Field • Austin, Texas || 2–3 || 40–19 || 14–9
|-

| style="font-size:88%" | "#" represents ranking. All rankings from Collegiate Baseball on the date of the contest."()" represents postseason seeding in the Big 10 Tournament or NCAA Regional, respectively.
|-
|Schedule Source

Austin Regional 

 Austin Regional Scores Source

Ranking movements

Awards and honors

Pre-season awards / Watch list

Regular season awards

Conference awards

See also
 2018 Big Ten Conference baseball tournament
 2018 NCAA Division I baseball tournament

References

Indiana
Indiana Hoosiers baseball seasons
Indiana
Indiana